Meanest Man Contest is a hip hop and electronic music duo based in San Francisco, California. The members are Quarterbar (Noah Blumberg) and Eriksolo (Eric Steuer).

As college roommates, Noah Blumberg and Eric Steuer started making lo-fi rap songs on a 4-track, then recruited friends to create the Santa Barbara hip-hop crew mic.edu. The duo formed Meanest Man Contest after a move upstate to Oakland, where they searched through stacks of flea market records looking for samples. From this effort came a series of short tracks that would form MMC's collage-like first single, Contaminated Dance Step. MMC's first LP, Merit, included jazz samples and live guitar. More recently, the duo has expanded its musical approach with releases like the off-kilter pop EP Some People, the electro-tinged single Throwing Away Broken Electronics, and the hip-hop releases Split and Partially Smart. In 2013 the group released Everything Worth Mentioning.

Discography

Albums

EPs

Singles

Compilations

References

External links 
 Meanest Man Contest

Hip hop groups from California
Musical groups from San Francisco
Hip hop duos
American musical duos
Plug Research artists